Besos de perro is the third studio album by Spanish rock band Marea released on 19 April 2002. With their third label contract signed in as many years, Marea went about recording their third album in February 2002 with producer Iñaki "Uoho" Antón, a guitarist in the bands Extremoduro and Platero y Tú. Besos de Perro was recorded over the course of two months in the home studio of Antón and features numerous contributions from outside musicians, including Roberto Iniesta (aka Robe, of Extremoduro), Fito Cabrales (of Platero y Tú and Fito & Fitipaldis), and Martín Romero (Kutxi's brother).

Track listing
"Romance de Jose Etxailarena" - 04:13
"El rastro" - 04:10
"La luna me sabe a poco" - 04:24
"A la mierda primavera" - 05:19
"En tu agujero" (feat. Roberto Iniesta) - 05:02
"Manuela canta saetas" - 03:53
"Alfileres" - 03:19
"Me estoy quedando solo" (feat. Martín Romero) - 04:00
"Venas con humo y palabras" - 04:35
"Como el viento de poniente" - 03:42
"Pan duro" (feat. Fito Cabrales) - 03:41

Certifications

References

Biography on their Official website

2002 albums
Spanish-language albums